Arlindo Leocadio Pinheiro (27 March 1971) he is a São Tomé and Principe athlete, who competed at the 2000 Summer Olympics in the Men's 110m hurdles he finished 6th in his heat and failed to advance. He also competed at the 1999 World Championships in Athletics and the 2003 World Championships in Athletics.

References

1971 births
Living people
São Tomé and Príncipe male hurdlers
Olympic athletes of São Tomé and Príncipe
Athletes (track and field) at the 2000 Summer Olympics
World Athletics Championships athletes for São Tomé and Príncipe